Homewreckers & Heartbreakers is the fifth album by English rock band the Quireboys, released in 2008. The song 'Mona Lisa Smiled' is inspired by the life and death of Salvador Dalí and his wife Gala. It has been described as approaching the style of AC/DC.

It was reissued in 2018 commemorating its tenth anniversary with the addition of five live songs.

Track listing
 Love This Dirty Town	
 Mona Lisa Smiled	
 Louder	
 Fear Within the Lie	
 Blackwater	
 One for the Road	
 Late Nite Saturday Call	
 Hall Of Shame	
 Take A Look At Yourself	
 Hello	
 Josephine	
 Louder (Reprise)

Personnel
Spike – vocals
Guy Griffin – guitars, backing vocals
Keith Weir – piano, keyboards, backing vocals
Paul Guerin – guitars, slide guitar
Jimi Crutchley - bass
Pip Mailing - drums

Additional musicians
 Gerry Atkins - brass
 Ian Bufton - brass
 Mark Joley - fiddle
 Rob Bond - pedal steel
 Ben Haswell - mandolin
 Nick Mailing - additional bass
 Simon Law - melotron
 Cherry Lee Mewis - backing vocals

References

2008 albums
The Quireboys albums